Western Welsh was a Welsh bus operating company, based in Cardiff covering South Wales and the northern parts of the West Country. Formed in 1920, it was nationalised when the BET Group sold their bus interests to the Transport Holding Company in 1967. From 1969 W.W. became a part of the National Bus Company and several years later was a component of the newly formed, but ill-fated, National Welsh operation.

Established in 1920 in Cardiff by a brewing family, South Wales Commercial Motors grew by acquisition, eventually operating bus services in South Wales as far west as St David's and Tenby in Pembrokeshire, and as far north as Brecon via the South Wales Valleys. In 1927, the company came to an agreement with the Great Western Railway to take over their bus services in both South Wales, and areas of southern Gloucestershire and northern Somerset surrounding Bristol and Bath. In return, the GWR took a minority share holding in the renamed Western Welsh.

In 1931, the GWR sold their bus company shareholdings to British Electric Traction, who continued expansion of the company by acquisition. As with other BET companies, Western Welsh's fleet included a significant number of AEC and Leyland types, including AEC Bridgemasters and Albion Nimbuses, all of which appeared in the company's familiar all-red livery.

Although entire UK railway network was nationalised in 1948 when they passed to the British Transport Commission, many bus services remained in private hands.

The Western Welsh Omnibus company had used a unique system for identifying the depôt to which a 'bus was allocated and up to 1948, these comprised symbols of squares, triangles, diamonds and circles coloured in black or red with thin white edging for the blacks and thick black edging for the reds. Following that year these were all changed to diamonds with their longer length vertical and the narrow width, horizontal and other colours were introduced and each diamond carried thick black edging with a thin white 'tracer' separating the outer and inner diamond colours within the symbol.
Main depôts were located at Cardiff, Barry, Bridgend, Carmarthen, Pontypool, Crosskeys, Neath and Brecon. Depôt symbol changes were Cardiff; Black triangle changed to orange diamond with a horizontal black band across its minor width, Barry; Black diamond retained but with inner thin white tracer, Bridgend: red triangle changed to blue diamond, Carmarthen: changed from red square to green diamond, Pontypool: changed from black circle to brown diamond with horizontal white bar across minor width (although another source has stated a black horizontal bar), Crosskeys: changed from a black square to a yellow diamond, Neath: red diamond retained but with thicker black edging, Brecon: changed from red circle to white diamond.(Not confirmed is that an Aberdare sub-depôt carried a red diamond with the black letters AE, within the red area. There were sub-depôts at other South Wales towns and as the Western Welsh took over some other ’bus companies, the depôt symbols were extended with variations in diamond filled in colour plus letters like AM for Ammanford and E for Ely works and colours grey and white were introduced and some diamonds bore two colours, split horizontally. The absorption of the former Neath & Cardiff (N&C) express ’bus company meant that a white triangle was added to the coach side. A separate colour chart of principal symbols seen on a wallchart in 1949 is viewable in jpg format on Wikipedia.

The Western Welsh Ely establishment stored certain buses in the open, including six-wheelers for some years, apparently out of use. A huge contingent of withdrawn single deck buses were stored at their Ely yard in 1960. Barry held an additional garage (since converted to flats) in the hill section of Harbour Road alongside the Barry-Bridgend railway & Barry sidings. It stored many Bedford vehicles with wooden slatted seats and these used to be brought into service for local relief carriage of passengers to and from Barry Island in the height of the summer seasons following the last war.

After BET sold its operations to the government, Western Welsh became part of the National Bus Company. In 1970, NBC transferred Western Welsh's operations west of Bridgend to its subsidiaries South Wales Transport and Crosville Motor Services. The company continued to operate further east until 1978, when it was merged with Red & White Services to form National Welsh Omnibus Services. National Welsh was privatised in 1987, and collapsed in 1992.

References

External links
History of National Welsh

Former bus operators in Wales
Companies based in Cardiff
Transport companies established in 1920
1920 establishments in Wales
Transport companies established in 1978
1978 disestablishments in Wales